A wild card (also wildcard or wild-card and also known as an at-large berth or at-large bid) is a tournament or playoff berth awarded to an individual or team that fails to qualify in the normal way; for example, by having a high ranking or winning a qualifying stage. In some events, wildcards are chosen freely by the organizers. Other events have fixed rules. Some North American professional sports leagues compare the records of teams which did not qualify directly by winning a division or conference.

International sports
In international sports, the term is perhaps best known in reference to two sporting traditions: team wildcards distributed among countries at the Olympic Games and individual wildcards given to some tennis players at every professional tournament (both smaller events and the major ones such as Wimbledon). Tennis players may even ask for a wildcard and get one if they want to enter a tournament on short notice.

In Olympics, countries that fail to produce athletes who meet qualification standards are granted "wildcards", which allow them to enter competitors whose proven abilities are below the standard otherwise required. In some instances, wildcards are given to the host nation in order to boost its chances. In Olympic and World Championship competitions in track and field and swimming, however, nations are automatically allowed to enter two competitors, so these instances are technically not wildcards. In some other Olympic sports, such as judo, archery, and badminton, wildcards are in use, and they are granted by the respective sport federations.
On rare occasions, a competitor who had gained entry by wildcard succeeds in winning a medal or the championship.  For example, Kye Sun-Hui won gold in judo at the 1996 Summer Olympics, Ding Junhui won the 2005 China Open snooker championship, Goran Ivanišević won the 2001 Wimbledon Championships, Kim Clijsters won the 2009 US Open, and Lin Dan won the 2013 BWF World Championships.

North America
In North American professional sports leagues, "wild card" refers to a team that qualifies for the championship playoffs without winning their specific conference or division outright. The number of wild card teams varies. In most cases, the rules of the league call for the wild card team to survive an extra round or to play the majority of their postseason games away from home. Although the exact rules among the leagues differ, they all generally agree that the wild card team (or teams, as in MLB, NFL, and NHL) are the ones with the best records among the teams that did not win their divisions; these teams usually finish as the runner-up to their division winners.

The term "wild card" does not apply to postseason formats where a set number of teams per division qualify. Former examples include: the American Football League's 1969 playoffs (qualifying the top two finishers from each division), the National Basketball Association's 1967-through-1970 playoffs (top four finishers from each division) and 1971–1972 playoffs (top two finishers in each division), and the National Hockey League's 1968–1974 and 1982–1993 playoffs (top four finishers from each division) are not true wild card formats. When a wild card playoff format is used, the number of teams in a division that qualify is not fixed; the divisional champion automatically qualifies, but non-division winners qualify, based either on league record or conference record.

Major League Baseball

In Major League Baseball (MLB), the wild card teams are the three teams in each of the two leagues (American and National) that have qualified for the postseason despite failing to win their division. Those teams in each league possess the three best winning percentages in their league after the three division winners. The wild card was first instituted in MLB in 1994, with one wild card team per league advancing to the Division Series in the postseason to face a division winner.

In 2012, the system was modified to add a second wild card team per league and pit each league's wild card teams against each other in a play-in game – the MLB Wild Card Game – the winner of which would then advance to the Division Series and play the team with the best record. The two teams with the best records outside of the division champions advanced to the wild card game. The two wild card teams could come out of the same division so there was no guarantee a team that came in second place in their division would make the playoffs.

Wild Card World Series champions
1997 Florida Marlins
2002 Anaheim Angels
2003 Florida Marlins
2004 Boston Red Sox
2011 St. Louis Cardinals
2014 San Francisco Giants
2019 Washington Nationals

Other wild card World Series participants
2000 New York Mets
2002 San Francisco Giants
2005 Houston Astros
2006 Detroit Tigers
2007 Colorado Rockies
2014 Kansas City Royals
2022 Philadelphia Phillies

National Football League

In the National Football League (NFL), since , each of the two conferences sends three wild card teams along with four division champions to its postseason. The first round of the playoffs is called the "wild card Round". In this round, each conference's division champion with the best regular-season record is awarded a first-round bye and granted automatic berth in the "Divisional Round". The four division champions are seeded from #1 through #4, while the three wild card teams are seeded #5 to #7; within these separations, seeding is by regular-season record. In the "wild card Round", the #7 team plays the #2 team, #6 plays #3, and #5 plays #4. In the "Divisional Round", the lowest-remaining seed plays the #1 seeded team, while the other two wild card winners face-off against each other, with the higher seed hosting. The higher-seeded teams have home-field advantage in both rounds and the "Conference Championships".

Background
The NFL was the first league ever to use the wild card format. The decision to implement a wild card coincided with the completion of the AFL-NFL merger in 1970. Prior to the merger, the right to compete in the postseason for the NFL title was restricted to division/conference champions. Until 1967, a tiebreaker game was played to resolve a deadlock for first place in either of the two conferences. When the league expanded to 16 teams, it realigned into four divisions and expanded the playoffs to two rounds. Tiebreaker games were eliminated in favor of the use of performance-based criteria to determine division champions. The rival American Football League (AFL), which reached a final size of ten teams in two divisions, also restricted its postseason to division winners until the 1969 season (the AFL's last as a separate league) when it expanded the playoffs to include division runners-up. The runners-up played the winners of the opposite divisions for the right to contest the AFL Championship Game.

Following AFL upsets in the last two Super Bowls prior to the merger, the merged league realigned into two conferences of thirteen teams each, with three "old-line" NFL teams joining the AFL teams in the American Football Conference (AFC), and the remaining NFL teams forming the National Football Conference (NFC). The decision to make the conferences equal in size meant they could not feasibly align into anything except three divisions of four or five teams in each conference. This led to a debate as to how the postseason of the merged league should be structured. Both the NFL and AFL playoff formats of 1969 had attracted fierce critics. The NFL format was criticized for its ability to cause a team tied for first overall in the league to miss the playoffs (this happened once, in 1967, when the Baltimore Colts missed the postseason despite a .917 winning percentage after losing a tiebreaker to the Los Angeles Rams). The AFL's 1969 playoffs were criticized by NFL purists for breaking with longstanding tradition, also, due to the fact that they allowed runners-up to qualify no matter how much disparity existed between the divisions, the AFL playoff structure could allow a mediocre team to qualify - this did occur when the Houston Oilers, a .500 team, finished second in the Eastern Division - the Oilers were throttled in the playoffs 56-7 by the Western champion Oakland Raiders. The Raiders went on to lose the AFL title game to the Western runner-up (and eventual Super Bowl IV champion) Kansas City Chiefs.

Despite Kansas City's win, some purists argued for the tradition of having only division champions contest the playoffs to continue. Had they prevailed, the post-merger NFL playoffs would have consisted of six teams and might have eventually evolved to closely resemble the playoffs of the modern Canadian Football League, with the regular season champion of each conference earning the right to host the championship game against the winner of a game between the champions of the other two divisions. However, the old-line NFL owners, who still expected their teams to dominate the merged league for at least the first half of the 1970s, thought a repeat of the 1967 Colts-Rams fiasco would be very likely under the new alignment combined with a six team format. Furthermore, the modern principle that home field advantage and byes should be awarded to the teams with the best records had still not yet been firmly established - tradition at the time dictated that home field advantage rotate between divisions and/or conferences regardless of record. In any event, most owners in both conferences wanted to keep the even four-team playoff field in each conference. This was established by having the three division champions in each conference joined by the best second-place finisher in the conference.

History
As with much of the NFL's nomenclature, the "wild card" was not initially referred to as such and was instead referred as the "Best Second-Place Team" (or sometimes simply as the "Fourth Qualifier"). The media, however, began referring to the qualifying teams as "wild cards". Eventually, the NFL officially adopted the term.

For the 1969 AFL playoffs, a "crossover" format was used such that the division winners played the runners up in the opposite division. This was done in part because division rivals had already played each other twice in the regular season and also in part because the AFL did not want the playoff games to be confused as "division championship games" - by keeping division rivals separate in the opening playoff round, the league left fans in no doubt that the regular season division winners were the only true division champions, even if a runner-up eventually won the league title. The NFL kept this principle in place by stipulating that a wild card team could never face its own division champion in the divisional round.

Following the implementation of the AFL–NFL merger prior to the 1970 season, from 1970 to 1974 the NFL used a rotation to determine which teams hosted playoff games, and which teams played which other teams.

From 1975 to 1977, the divisional playoffs featured the #1 seed hosting the "wild card" team, and the #2 seed hosting the #3 seed unless the #1 seed and wild card team were divisional rivals; in that case, the #1 seed hosted the #3 seed and the #2 seed hosted the wild card team. The "wild card" team in each conference was the team with the best record in its conference excluding the #1–3 seeds.

The number of wild card qualifiers was expanded to two per conference in 1978 – the divisional winners were granted a bye week while the wild card teams, seeded #4 and #5, played each other in a "wild card game" with the #4 seed having home field advantage. Since there were two wild card games, one per conference, the phrase "wild card round" came into use. During this time, the #1 seed hosted the winner of the #4 vs #5 wild card game, while the #2 seed played the #3 seed. However, the rule that teams from the same division could not play each other in the divisional round continued, so if the #1 seed and the winner of the #4 vs #5 wild card game were in the same division, then the #1 seed played the #3 seed, while the #2 seed played the #4 vs #5 winner.

To address the oddity of one wild card team per conference hosting a playoff game (albeit in an earlier round) while one division winner per conference did not automatically have the right to host a playoff game, the playoffs were expanded again to three wild cards per conference in 1990 (for 12 teams total) with the lowest-ranked divisional winner losing its bye but gaining the right to host a playoff game. Following the addition of the Houston Texans in 2002, the league added a fourth division to each conference. The league decided not to change the number of playoff teams, and thus the number of wild card qualifiers was reduced to two per conference. In 2020, the playoffs returned to three wild cards per conference, or 14 teams total. The term "wild card Round" continues to be used for the opening round of the playoffs, even though this round has involved both division winners and wild card teams since 1990.

As of the 2021–22 playoffs, there has never been a meeting of two wild card teams in the Super Bowl; the closest that came to happening was in the 2010–11 playoffs, when the Green Bay Packers and New York Jets went on Cinderella runs after finishing as the second wild card team in each of their conferences (the NFC and AFC, respectively); the Packers won the NFC Championship Game and went on to win the Super Bowl, while the Jets' Cinderella story ended with a one-score loss to the Steelers in the AFC Championship Game.

From 2002 to 2019, the only way a wild card team could host a playoff game within their respective conference (Super Bowls are considered neutral site games regardless of home venue) would be for both wild card teams to reach the Conference Championship Game by each winning two road playoff games:

 The No. 5 seeded wild card wins @ the No. 4 seeded division winner in the wild card Round and wins @ the No. 2 seeded division winner in the Divisional Round
 The No. 6 seeded wild card wins @ the No. 3 seeded division winner in the wild card Round and wins @ the No. 1 seeded division winner in the Divisional Round
The No. 5 seeded wild card would host the No. 6 seeded wild card in the Championship Game.

Since 2020, it has been possible for a wild card team to host a Divisional Round playoff game. This requires that all three wild card teams (seeded 5–7) win their wild card games on the road since teams are re-seeded. The matchups in the Divisional Round would be:
 The No. 7 seeded wild card @ the No. 1 seeded division winner
 The No. 6 seeded wild card @ the No. 5 seeded wild card

wild card Super Bowl champions
1980–81 Oakland Raiders–Super Bowl XV 
1997–98 Denver Broncos–Super Bowl XXXII 
2000–01 Baltimore Ravens–Super Bowl XXXV
2005–06: Pittsburgh Steelers–Super Bowl XL
2007–08: New York Giants–Super Bowl XLII
2010–11: Green Bay Packers–Super Bowl XLV
2011–12: New York Giants–Super Bowl XLVI
2020–21: Tampa Bay Buccaneers–Super Bowl LV

Other wild card Super Bowl participants
 1985–86: New England Patriots–Super Bowl XX
 1992–93: Buffalo Bills–Super Bowl XXVII
 1999–2000: Tennessee Titans–Super Bowl XXXIV

The 1980 Raiders, 2005 Steelers, and 1992 Bills tied for first in their division but lost a tiebreaker. 

While not a wild card team, the 1969 Kansas City Chiefs were the first non-division winner to win the Super Bowl. They finished second in the Western Division of the American Football League, and in that season, the last before the merger, the AFL went from having its two division winners meeting for the league title to adding a second round in which the second place team in each division qualified for the post-season. These teams played cross-division in the semifinal round. Thus the Chiefs, who finished second in the West, defeated the East Division champion New York Jets in the AFL semifinals and then defeated the West Division champion Oakland Raiders to advance to Super Bowl IV, where they beat the Minnesota Vikings. Because the term "wild card" was not instituted until the following year, the Chiefs are not included in the above list, but are recognized as the first team to win the Super Bowl without winning a division title.

National Basketball Association

Although the National Basketball Association (NBA) includes wild card teams in their playoff structures, the term "wild card" is seldom used; instead, each playoff team is most commonly denoted by its seeding position within the conference.

In the NBA, division champions within each conference were given the #1-3 seeds based on their regular-season records. The next five best teams are awarded seeds #4-8, also based on their regular-season records. In the NBA playoffs, home court advantage is determined strictly by regular-season record, without regard to seeding.

Before the 2006–07 NBA season, the NBA seeded its teams in the same manner as the NHL. Until 2015, the NBA seeded the three division winners and the wild card team with the best record by regular-season record. This means that the wild card with the best record got a seed as high as #2 (if that team is in the same division as the team with the best record in the conference); however, the next four wild card teams will still be limited to the #5 through #8 seeds. This change was made to ensure that the two best teams in each conference cannot meet until the conference final, and also (allegedly) to try and eliminate incentives for a playoff-bound team to deliberately lose games at the end of the regular season in order to "choose" a higher-seeded team that has won fewer games (and, due to the unique home-court rules of the NBA, possibly gain home-court advantage for that series).

The notion of "wild cards" was essentially abolished in the 2015–16 NBA season, as changes made prior to the season mean the top eight teams in each conference qualify regardless of divisional rank, with the seeded teams ranked by percentage. The only particular advantage to winning a division now is that a divisional title serves as the first tiebreaker for qualification seeding purposes. Unlike some other leagues, there is no tie-breaker advantage at all to finishing in any divisional rank lower than first – meaning (for example) that while a division winner will automatically win a tie-breaker over another division's runner-up, a division runner-up will not automatically win a tie-breaker over teams finishing third, fourth or fifth in other divisions. The new format means it is possible for an especially weak division to send no teams (not even its champion) to the NBA playoffs, although as of the start of the 2020–21 season this has not yet occurred.

In the NBA, the winner of the #1 vs. #8 series goes on to face the winner of the #5 vs. #4 series, while the winner of the #2 vs. #7 series faces the winner of the #6 vs. #3 series. The winner of the #1 vs. #8 series will usually play against a wild card team in the Conference Semifinals; this is arranged deliberately to reward the #1 seeded team by giving it the most winnable matchups in the first and second rounds, although this is not always the case in event of an upset because the NBA does not re-seed teams following the first round. For instance, if the #6 seed upsets the #3 seed and the higher seed wins the remaining first round matchups within the conference, the #1 seed would face the #4 seed, while the #2 seed would face the #6 seed in the Conference Semifinals.

National Hockey League

In the National Hockey League (NHL), the first, second, and third place teams in each division qualify for the playoffs automatically, and two additional teams, regardless of divisional alignment, also qualify by having the best records among the remaining teams in the conference. These teams are referred to as the wild cards. In the First Round, the division champions play the wild cards, while the second and third placed teams in each division play each other; therefore the bracket is fixed, like the NBA. Home-ice advantage is given to the higher seed in the first two rounds, with the better regular season record being used in the Conference Finals and Stanley Cup Finals.

The NHL's current format is similar in some respects to the "cross-over rule" used by the Canadian Football League since 1997 in that it the format emphasizes intra-divisional ranking and brackets in the playoff structure and yet allows two teams from one division to qualify for the playoffs at the expense of the two teams finishing with worse records and in the same divisional ranks in another division. The main difference is that the CFL only allows the lowest ranked playoff qualifying team from a division to cross over into the other division's playoffs, whereas in the NHL it is possible for either wild card team to "cross over" to the other division, or even (in cases where four teams qualify from each division) for the wild card teams to swap divisional playoff brackets. Also, unlike the CFL the NHL does not require the second wild card qualifier to have an outright better record than a superior-ranked team in the other division – in the event of such a tie at the end of the NHL season standard tie-breaking procedures are used to determine playoff qualification.

From 1999 until 2013, three division champions within each conference were given the #1-3 seeds based on their regular-season records. Among the remaining teams within each conference, five additional teams with the best records are awarded seeds #4 through #8. The division champions (first-third seeds) and the non-division winning team with the best record (fourth seed) were given home ice advantage in the opening playoff series, in which they face the eighth-seeded through fifth-seeded teams, respectively. However, the playoff format differed slightly from that of the NBA. In the NHL, the highest-remaining seed of the first round played the lowest-remaining seed of the first round in the next round of the playoffs. For example, if the #1, #4, #6, and #7 seeds win their respective first round series then the second round of the playoffs matched the #1 seed (highest) versus the #7 seed (lowest) and the #4 seed (2nd highest) versus the #6 seed (second lowest). Home ice advantage in each NHL playoff series prior to the Stanley Cup Finals was granted by the higher seed, even if the "wild card" team had a better regular season record. For the Finals, the team with the better record will receive home ice advantage.

Major League Soccer

Major League Soccer (MLS), the top level of soccer (football) in both countries, used a wild card format starting in its 2011 playoffs. The top three teams from each of its two conferences automatically qualified for the conference semifinals, while the four remaining teams with the highest point totals in league play, without regard to conference, earned "wild cards" into the playoffs. The wild card matches were single games, with the #7 seed hosting the #10 seed and the #8 seed hosting the #9 seed. The lowest surviving seed then played the Supporters' Shield winner (i.e., the team with the highest point total), while the other surviving wild card played the top seed in the other conference.

The playoff format was revamped for the 2012 season, with all seeding done entirely in-conference, therefore eliminating any true wild card qualifiers. From 2012 to 2018, the top six teams from each conference qualified for the playoffs, with the #1 & #2 seeds in each conference automatically qualifying for the conference semifinals, and seeds #3-6 in each conference being wild cards. The lowest-seeded winner (played between the #4 & #5, and #3 & #6 seeds) in each conference played the #1 seed, and the next-lowest played the #2 seed in the conference semifinals. In 2019, the playoffs were expanded to the top seven teams in each conference, with only the conference regular season champion receiving a first-round bye.

Canadian championship curling
Curling Canada introduced wild card teams starting with the 2018 Scotties Tournament of Hearts and 2018 Tim Hortons Brier. The change was made as part of a wider set of changes which expanded the tournaments to 17 teams and eliminated the unpopular pre-qualifying tournaments. From 2018, the round robin stage of the Tournament of Hearts and Brier will consist of two seeded "pools" of eight teams as opposed to the old format consisting a single group of twelve teams. This allows the main tournament to include "Team Canada" (either the defending champions or, when the champions decline to or are unable to defend their title, the runners-up) and teams representing all fourteen constituent associations representing the ten provinces and three territories plus Northern Ontario. The remaining two participants in the tournament are the wild cards, which compete in an MLB-style play-in game prior to the main tournament to determine the sixteenth team in the main tournament. Just as is the case with MLB division titles, the format is designed to give teams an incentive to win their provincial championships. The wild cards are the top two teams in the Canadian Team Ranking System (CTRS) standings that did not win either the previous year's tournament or their respective provincial or territorial championship. The top ranked of these two teams receives the hammer (last rock) to start the game.

The CTRS standings are also used to determine the seeding of all teams in the main tournament, with one important caveat - for the purposes of seeding the round robin pools and so as to allow the main round robin schedule to be drawn up prior to the wild card game, the ranking of the top wild card team is the ranking that is used for seeding purposes regardless of who wins the game. Whereas teams in the Tournament of Hearts and Brier are traditionally referred to by their respective province or territory (other than Northern Ontario and Team Canada), the team that wins the wild card game is referred to as the "wild card" for the duration of the tournament. As is the case with Team Canada, the wild card retains that designation even if the team that is representing the same province or territory as the wild card team is eliminated prior to the wild card team.

With the introduction of pools, the round robin portion of the Tournament of Hearts and Brier now consists of two stages. The top four teams in each pool qualify for the second stage, formally known as the "Championship Pool." Unlike most tournaments which use a similar format, teams carry over their entire round robin records from the preliminary stage as opposed to only those results against teams that also qualify. This ensures that each Championship Pool team still plays eleven games that count for the purposes of determining playoff qualification.

The format is designed to ensure that a competitive team fills the wild card slot - due to the significant disparity in playing caliber between the top teams of Canada's fourteen member associations, it is widely expected that the wild card will consistently come from one of the provinces with the toughest fields in the playdowns, and that it will consistently be a championship contending team.

The format was changed for the 2021 curling season due to the COVID-19 pandemic. For at least that year, tournaments will expand to eighteen teams each. Three wild card teams will gain direct entry into the main draw, which expanded to pools of nine teams each. As a result, teams that advance to the championship pool will play twelve round robin games instead of eleven. To accommodate the expanded round robin schedule, the playoffs will revert to the old three team, two game format thus eliminating the page playoff and quarter-final round.

Canadian Football League
While the Canadian Football League does not officially use the term "wild card" to denote any playoff qualifier, its crossover rule acts similar to a wild card in many respects.

Calls to change the CFL's playoff format came about soon after the CFL finished its evolution from two regional conferences, which were originally the Interprovincial Rugby Football Union in the East and the Western Interprovincial Football Union in the West. Although the CFL was officially founded in 1958, its constituent sections did not fully merge until 1981. At the time, it was agreed that three teams from each division would qualify, regardless of overall league standings. This quickly proved controversial, as a wide disparity in playing caliber had emerged between the East and West divisions. Since the league had also implemented a fully balanced schedule (each of the nine teams played each opponent once at home and once on the road), this disparity (made even worse by the fact the West had one more team than the East) was fully exposed in the standings - in each of the first three seasons of the new format, the fourth place team missed the playoffs with records as good as 9–7 in the West, while in the East records as bad as 3-13 were good enough for third place and a playoff berth. In 1981, even the fifth place Western team's record of 6-10 was good enough for outright possession of sixth place overall.

In 1986, the playoff format was changed. The new format the fourth place team in one division to qualify if it finished with an outright better record than the third place team in the other division. The Eastern owners agreed in exchange for expanding the schedule to 18 games, and also with a stipulation that the qualifying fourth-place team would stay in its own division for the playoffs. As a result, the change introduced the possibility of a four team bracket in one division and a two-game total point series in the other (the two game total point format was nothing new in Canadian football - it was commonly used until the early 1970s). It also introduced the possibility of the first place teams losing their traditional byes based on results elsewhere in the league. This occurred in 1986, when the 11-7 Calgary Stampeders qualified in place of the 4-14 Montreal Alouettes. The Alouettes folded before the start of the following season. Although it is highly questionable whether a 1986 playoff appearance would have saved the floundering Montreal franchise, the CFL quickly re-instated the traditional playoff format for the 1987 season. It also moved the Winnipeg Blue Bombers (the West's easternmost team) to the Eastern Division. This balanced the divisions both in numbers as well as, to a considerable extent, in playing caliber, and the reduction in teams also caused the schedule to be changed to emphasize more divisional games. As a result, the three top finishers of the two divisions finishers always had the six best league records from 1987 up until the start of the league's U.S. expansion experiment, which started in the 1993.

The current rule was adopted after the league re-activated the Alouettes and reverted to an all-Canadian alignment in 1996. It allows the fourth place team of one division to "cross over" and take the place of the third place team in the other divisional bracket, provided the fourth place team has more points (i.e. an outright better record) than the third place team. Since the cross over team enters as the third place team, it never receives home field advantage in the playoffs, even if its record is better than that of one or both of the qualifying teams in the other division.

As of 2019, all teams to qualify under this rule have crossed over from the Western Division to the Eastern bracket, although there have been a handful of occasions where a fourth placed Eastern team was in mathematical contention for a Western cross-over berth late in the season. Cross-over teams have advanced as far as the Eastern Final, but as of 2018 have never advanced to the Grey Cup game. There is no provision for a fifth placed team in one division to cross over in place of the other division's runner-up, even if it has a better record; in 2018 the Edmonton Eskimos finished fifth in the West with a 9–9 record and missed the playoffs while the Hamilton Tiger-Cats finished 8-10 and qualified as Eastern runners-up. Thus, it is theoretically possible (but it has not yet occurred) that all four Eastern Division teams could reach the playoffs, but not for all five Western Division teams.

Professional tennis 
In professional tennis tournaments, a wildcard refers to a tournament entry awarded to a player at the discretion of the organizers. All ATP and WTA tournaments have a few spots set aside for wildcards in both the main draw, and the qualifying draw, for players who otherwise would not have made either of these draws with their professional ranking. They are usually awarded to players from the home and/or sponsoring country (sometimes after a tournament where the winner is awarded the wildcard), promising young players, players that are likely to draw a large crowd, or have won the tournament earlier or players who were once ranked higher and are attempting a comeback (for instance, following a long-term injury). High-ranked players can also ask for a wildcard if they want to enter a non-mandatory tournament after the normal entry deadline; for example, because they lost early in another tournament. This means a wildcard player sometimes becomes the top seed.

The organizers of three of the Grand Slam tournaments —the Australian Open, French Open, and US Open— grant one wildcard nomination to each of the other two. Christopher Clarey described this practice as "nothing more than mutual back scratching" and "an outdated symbol of elitism".

Notable wildcards
 In 2001, Goran Ivanišević won the Wimbledon Men's Singles championships having been handed a wildcard entry by the organising All England Lawn Tennis and Croquet Club. At the time, he was ranked world No. 125 after a shoulder injury but had earlier reached the final three times.
 In 2009, Kim Clijsters won the US Open tournament, after receiving a wildcard entry. It was her first Grand Slam tournament since announcing her comeback to the sport, having first retired in 2007 to start a family. She was a former champion and world No. 1 but was unranked since she had only played two other tournaments (also on wildcards) since her comeback, and three were required to get a rank.
 In 2012, Jonathan Marray and Frederik Nielsen won the Wimbledon Men's Doubles after being selected as a wildcard. They had no significant results but Marray was a home player.
 In 2017, Maria Sharapova was granted a wildcard to play in the US Open. She was a former champion and had finished serving a 15-month doping ban earlier in the year.
 In 2019, 15-year-old Coco Gauff received a wildcard to play at the Wimbledon qualifying event, and advanced to the last 16 of the main draw.
 In 2019, Canadian teenager Bianca Andreescu became the first wildcard to win Indian Wells.
 In 2022, Thanasi Kokkinakis and Nick Kyrgios became the first wildcard men's doubles entry to win at the Australian Open

Motorsport

Motorcycle racing

In motorcycle racing the term 'wildcard' is used for competitors only involved in individual rounds of a championship, usually their local round. Local riders taking advantage of their local knowledge (often having raced that circuit on that bike before) and affording to take risks without planning for a championship, often upset established runners. Makoto Tamada and Shaky Byrne have both taken double victories in Superbike World Championship rounds in their home countries. 
The most famous wildcard entry perhaps was the late Daijiro Kato with finishing 3rd at his first appearance in 1996 and then winning the Japanese 250cc Grand Prix back to back in 1997 and 1998 on his way to become the most successful 250cc World Champion of all time in 2001.

Grand Prix motorcycle racing

Each Grand Prix host Federation (FMNR) may nominate 3 wildcard entries for the Moto3 and Moto2 classes in their own Grand Prix only.

The MSMA (Motorcycle Sport Manufacturers’ Association) may, at each event, nominate 1 wildcard entry for the Moto2 and MotoGP classes.

The FIM may, at each event, nominate 2 wildcard entries for the Moto3 and Moto2 classes and FIM/DORNA may, at each event, nominate 1 wildcard entry for the MotoGP class.

Superbike World Championship

Each Event host Federation (FMNR) may nominate 4 wildcard entries for the Superbike class and 2 wildcard entries for the Supersport and Superstock classes, in their own event only.

The FIM may nominate 2 wildcard entries for the Superbike class.

Motorcycle Speedway

In Motorcycle Speedway, wildcards compete in the Speedway Grand Prix events in which there is 1 wildcard per competition (until 2005 there were 2 per Grand Prix).  six wildcards have won a Grand Prix: Mark Loram in 1999, Martin Dugard in 2000, Hans Andersen in 2006 (later that year he replaced a permanent rider and went on to win another GP), Michael Jepsen Jensen in 2012, Adrian Miedziński in 2013 and Bartosz Zmarzlik in 2014.

Auto racing
Wildcard entries are not unknown in auto racing either, although the Concorde Agreement in modern-day Formula One requires all teams to participate in every event. John Love came close to winning the 1967 South African Grand Prix in a wildcard-type situation, long before the term had been coined. Although the term is rarely used in NASCAR, the concept of a road course ringer is similar. Before the late-1990s, NEXTEL Cup and Busch Series races in the West and Northeast respectively would have several drivers from the Winston West and Busch North series, as the series regulations were very similar, and until the mid-2000s, ARCA drivers would usually attempt Cup races in the Midwest and at restrictor-plate races.

NASCAR has rules currently in lower-tier series (Xfinity and Truck), but prior to 2015, Cup, where the top teams that did not qualify on time qualified based on owner points.  Officially known a provisional starting positions, they are the opportunity for a "wildcard" type starting position at the end of the grid. This allowed track owners to advertise and guarantee to fans that the most popular drivers would participate in the race (pleasing fans in attendance, and preventing no-shows) even if the driver had an unfortunate mishap (e.g., blown engine) or crash during time trials.  All provisionals are based on team performance, except in lower tiers where past champion status or most recent winning driver, can earn the provisional.

During the NASCAR Sprint All-Star Race (a non-points exhibition event) one driver who fails to qualify for the race is awarded a wildcard spot via "Fans Choice" vote. In 2008, Kasey Kahne, was selected as a wildcard via fan vote, and went on to win the race.

From 2011 to 2013, NASCAR's top-level Sprint Cup Series, since renamed the Monster Energy NASCAR Cup Series, used "wildcards" in a different context, namely that of qualifying for the season-ending Chase for the Sprint Cup, now rebranded as the NASCAR playoffs. In previous seasons, the top 12 drivers in championship points after the first 26 races of the season automatically qualified for the Chase, with their points reset to a point unreachable by any other driver. Under the 2011–2013 system, only the top 10 drivers automatically qualified. The other two Chase qualifiers were the two drivers ranked from 11th through 20th after 26 races with the most race wins, with tiebreakers used as necessary to restrict the number of "wildcards" to two. Major changes to the Chase format that took effect in 2014, most notably determining the newly expanded Chase field of 16 mainly by race wins, eliminated this type of "wildcard".

College and university sports
NCAA tournaments in all of its sports have included wildcard berths, typically known as at-large berths or at-large bids. Winners of each athletic conference's tournament (or, in the case of basketball's National Invitation Tournament, the team with the best regular season record in that conference) are granted automatic bids into the tournament, and a selection committee fills the remaining slots in the tournament bracket with who it determines to be the best teams who did not win their tournament (in practice, major conferences with stronger reputations and more revenue are invariably favored over mid-majors with similar records).

College basketball

Each year, the NCAA grants automatic berths in both the men's and women's Division I basketball tournaments to the winners of 32 conferences. Since the Ivy League added a conference tournament in 2017, every conference's automatic berth is granted to the team that wins its conference postseason tournament.

The NCAA has established Selection Committees for both the men's and women's tournaments. Teams that did not win their conference tournament may be eligible to earn an at-large berth. At-large berths are determined by record, ranking, the strength of schedule, and many other factors. A key factor in determining at-large berths is the Ratings Percentage Index, popularly referred to as the NET.

The fields of 68 teams that participate in both the men's tournament and the women's tournament are filled as follows:
32 automatic berths (since the 2021-22 season, winners of each conference tournament)  
At-large berths
36 in the men's tournament
36 in the women's tournament

After all automatic berths are filled, the teams that did not win their conference tournaments are studied to see if they can make the tournament anyway. Once conference tournaments are complete, the Selection Committee need not consider conference affiliations in determining at-large berths, making it free to select as many teams from one conference as it deems correct. Most mid-major conferences or smaller conferences will receive no at-large berths, and only the winner of the conference tournament will advance to the NCAA Tournament, making for some heartbreaking moments in the tournaments of smaller conferences.

The conference tournaments of major conferences are generally less important, as most losers will make the "Big Dance" via an at-large bid, but often lesser big conference teams will sneak in using the conference tournament, stealing a bid from a deserving mid-major team in the long run.

At-large berths are not necessarily lesser teams than automatic berths. They simply did not play well enough at the time of their conference tournaments. Often, at-large berths will get higher seeds than the teams that beat them in the conference tourney, because the Selection Committee judges base their judgment on the entire season.

Division I independents do not play a conference tournament and therefore do not have an automatic berth, and can only receive an at-large bid to the tournament, which rarely happens in today's game. Sometimes, a team that is otherwise deserving of a bid may be ineligible for the tournament due to an NCAA post-season ban, applied only as a punishment for egregious violations of NCAA rules in that school's program in that sport.

With a 68-team field and 32 automatic berths, the Selection Committee must pick the 36 (men's and women's) most deserving teams that are left, which ends up being a long difficult process, which culminates in one of the most intense days in U.S. sports, Selection Sunday. Selection Sunday is a televised event where the brackets are revealed. There are almost always interesting arguments about who should be in and who should be out because there are often more than 34 teams that could be considered deserving of a bid. Many final teams that make it, and final teams that are cut are often thought of as interchangeable. This ends up resulting, sometimes, in major surprises of who makes the tournament as at-large teams. At-large teams often will win the tournament which included the last four NCAA Men's Basketball Champions (Connecticut in 2014, Duke in 2015, Villanova in 2016 and North Carolina in 2017).

Conferences
The conferences that are known for many at-large bids are generally the so-called Power Five conferences that receive automatic places in the bowl games associated with the College Football Playoff—the ACC, Big Ten, Big 12,  Pac-12, and SEC.

Other conferences that receive multiple at-large bids on a regular basis are the high-major offshoots of the original Big East Conference, the current Big East and The American. The Atlantic 10 and the Mountain West receive multiple bids on a regular basis as well. The Horizon League, Mid-American Conference,  Missouri Valley and West Coast Conference have also received more than just the automatic berth several times.

Certain conferences have never, and probably will not in the near future, get an at-large bid, simply because no team in the conference can ever be one of the best 68 teams in the country, and even if one does, two at the same time would be virtually unheard of. Therefore, it is also often argued that these very small conferences do not even deserve their one automatic bid and it should be given to a more deserving large conference team. Most argue that this would take away from the point of the 68-team large tournament style, that always gives the underdog the chance for an upset. These conferences include the Big Sky Conference and the Southwestern Athletic Conference. One of these conferences recently made an argument for their best team to make the tournament, even though it lost in the conference tourney. Oral Roberts of the Mid-Continent Conference blew through their conference in the regular season but lost in the conference tournament, ending with a conference record of 17–1. They did not make the tournament, and Oakland University won the bid. Utah State and Holy Cross also had arguments like this recently. A new way to solve the problem is to attempt to switch to a more prominent conference, a phenomenon that was especially prevalent in 2005 and the early 2010s. Many teams made significant moves in that period, with some making multiple moves. A few of the more notable moves were:
 Butler (Horizon League to A10 in 2012, then to the new Big East in 2013)
 Louisville (C-USA to Big East in 2005, spent one season in The American after the 2013 Big East split, then to the ACC in 2014)
 TCU (C-USA to MW in 2005, then to the Big 12 in 2012)
 UCF (Atlantic Sun Conference to C-USA in 2005, then to The American in 2013)
 Utah (MW to Pac-12 in 2011)

Other tournaments
The NIT, held for the best teams that did not make the NCAA Tournament, was at one time an entirely at-large event (hence its name, the National Invitation Tournament); new regulations, however, offer automatic bids to teams regular season conference champions which failed to win their post-season conference tournament. The College Basketball Invitational and CollegeInsider.com Postseason Tournament both seed their entire tournaments with at-large bids.

College football

At-large bids are sometimes used for bowl games contested between NCAA Division I Football Bowl Subdivision teams. Most bowl games have tie-ins with specific conferences; for example, the Rose Bowl Game has traditionally hosted conference champions from the Big Ten Conference and Pac-12 Conference (or their predecessors). Conferences are sometimes unable to provide a team to a bowl that they have a tie-in with; this happens when a conference has signed tie-in contracts with more bowls than the number of bowl-eligible teams it has in a given year. In such cases, bowl organizers will issue an at-large bid to a team in another conference or an independent team.

For example, the 2009 Humanitarian Bowl had tie-ins with the Western Athletic Conference and the Mountain West Conference. However, the TCU Horned Frogs of Mountain West were selected for the Fiesta Bowl (a New Year's Six bowl game), and all of the Mountain West's other teams were either tied into other bowls or ineligible. As a result, bowl organizers issued an at-large bid, which went to the Bowling Green Falcons of the Mid-American Conference.

Game shows

Jeopardy!

Wildcards are a regular feature in tournaments of the popular game show Jeopardy!.

Jeopardy! tournaments generally run for 10 consecutive episodes (which air from Monday to Friday inclusive over two weeks) and feature 15 contestants. The first week's five episodes, called the "quarter-finals", feature three new contestants each day. The winners of these five games, and the four highest scoring non-winners ("wildcards"), advance to the semi-finals, which run for three days. The winners of these three games advance to play in a two-game final match, in which the scores from both games are combined to determine the overall winner. This format has been used since the first Tournament of Champions in 1985 and was devised by the late long time host Alex Trebek himself.

To prevent later contestants from playing to beat the earlier wildcard scores instead of playing to win, contestants are "completely isolated from the studio until it is their time to compete."

If there is a tie for the final wildcard position, the non-winner that advances will be based on the same regulations as two contestants who tie for second in a regular game; the tie-breaker is the contestant's score after the Double Jeopardy! round, and if further tied, the score after the Jeopardy! round determines the contestant who advances as the wildcard.

If two or more contestants tie for the highest score (greater than zero) at the end of a first round match, the standard tiebreaker is used with the player who loses that tiebreaker eligible for a wildcard. If none of the contestants in a quarter-final or semi-final game end with a positive score, no contestant automatically qualifies from that game, and an additional wildcard contestant advances instead. This occurred in the quarter-finals of the 1991 Seniors Tournament and the semi-finals of the 2013 Teen Tournament.

In the 2022 Polish version Tournament of Champions, which used 18 players, the 18 players were split into two groups of nine.  The three winners in each group played in the semifinals, and the wild card was given to the highest scoring non-winner there to advance to the finals.

Use outside North America 

Although the term "wildcard" is not generally common in sports outside North America, a few competitions effectively (used to) employ such a system to determine one or more reserved places in a particular phase of a competition.

Olympics 
In the Olympics, several sport governing bodies award wildcards to nations in order to further promote their sport. Sports governing bodies will either make selections or hold a tournament to determine the wildcards. One such notable wildcard selection was Equatorial Guinea swimmer Eric Moussambani, who finished last in the 100m meter event in the 2000 Summer Olympics. Other times, wildcard spots are offered to ease political tension such as the case of North Korean athletes participating in the 2018 Winter Olympics despite most of them not meeting the qualification criteria.

Basketball

FIBA Basketball World Cup 

The world championship for basketball, the FIBA Basketball World Cup, invites four wildcards to complete its 24-team field. Teams have to participate in qualifying for the World Cup, have to apply to be one, and FIBA is not allowed more than three teams from the same continent in order to be selected. This setup began in 2006, where Italy, Puerto Rico, Serbia and Montenegro, and Turkey were selected by FIBA; Turkey made the best performance, reaching the quarterfinals. In 2010, FIBA selected Germany, Lithuania, Lebanon, and Russia as the wildcards, with Lithuania finishing third, and Russia making it to the quarterfinals. For the 2014 FIBA Basketball World Cup, FIBA selected Brazil, Finland, Greece, and Turkey; 2014 will be the last time FIBA will select wildcards, as the 2019 FIBA Basketball World Cup would no longer have wildcards when it expands to 32 teams. The perennial top two FIBA Oceania team namely Australia and New Zealand as wildcard teams of FIBA Asia Cup 2017 in Lebanon. These two teams are also part of FIBA Asia in Basketball tournaments including FIBA World Qualifying Tournament for FIBA World Cup 2019 in China.

Philippine Basketball Association 

In the Philippine Basketball Association, the playoffs are done after an elimination (in 2005–06, a classification) round where the top two teams with the best records are given semi-final byes, the next 3 are given quarterfinal byes, the next 4 are given entry to the wildcard phase, and the tenth team is eliminated.

The winner of the wildcard playoffs, varying in format from a round-robin, a single-elimination or sudden death, usually meets the strongest quarterfinalist (the 3rd seed). The wildcard winner's next opponent for the quarterfinals rested while the wildcard phase was ongoing so the chance of advancing to the semi-finals (in which a team rested longer) is slim.

The only wildcard champion are the 7th-seeded Barangay Ginebra Kings in the 2004 PBA Fiesta Conference after 7 years of championship drought they made an epic run all the way to the throne, in which the top 2 teams were given semifinal byes while the bottom eight went through a knock-out wildcard tournament. Since the addition of the quarterfinal bye, no wildcard has entered the Finals, although the Air21 Express won the third-place trophy at the 2005-06 PBA Fiesta Conference. The wildcard set up was no longer used when the league reverted to the 3-conference format starting from the 2010–11 PBA season.

Euroleague 

The Euroleague, a Europe-wide competition for elite basketball clubs, once had one "wildcard" advancing from its first phase, officially the Regular Season, to its second, called the Top 16. The rule was in place through the 2007–08 season.

At that time, the competition began each year with 24 clubs, divided into three groups. (Today, the competition starts with a preliminary stage of 16 teams playing down to two survivors, who join 22 other teams in the Regular Season.) Then as now, the groups played a double round-robin for the Regular Season, with eight clubs eliminated and the remaining clubs advancing to the Top 16. Under the rules in place through 2007–08, the top five clubs in each group automatically advanced. The final "wildcard" spot in the Top 16 went to the sixth-place club with the best overall record, with three potential tiebreaking steps. A coin toss is not indicated as a possible step.

Starting in 2008–09, the "wildcard" was abolished when the Regular Season was reorganized into four groups with 6 teams apiece. Now, the top four teams in each group advance to the Top 16. No change to the tiebreakers was made.

Starting in 2016–17 with the new league format, wildcard have been reintroduced.

ISU Grand Prix of Figure Skating Final 

For both the junior and senior Grand Prix of Figure Skating Final (which starting in the 2008–2009 figure skating season will be merged into a single two-division event), the hosting federation may issue a wildcard invitation to one of their own skaters should no skater from the host country qualify for the event through the Grand Prix circuit.  Use of the wildcard has not been common; however, it was used at the 2007–2008 Junior Grand Prix Final by the Polish federation.

All-Ireland Senior (Gaelic) Football Championship 

In the All-Ireland Senior Football Championship, the premier competition in Gaelic football, each of the thirty-two counties in Ireland as well as London and New York play in their respective Provincial Championships through a knock-out cup competition format without seeds. The winners of each of the four Provincial Championships earn one of eight places in the All-Ireland Quarter Finals.

The thirty teams that fail to win their respective Provincial Championships receive a second opportunity to reach the All-Ireland Series via the All Ireland Qualifiers (also known as the 'back door', similar to a wildcard).

Road cycling 

In road cycling (teams), a wildcard refers to an invitation to a race which a particular team would not normally be able to enter. Usually used for top division (currently UCI World Tour) races where the organization want more teams, lower league teams will be invited. It is very common to offer a wildcard for teams from the same country to help local sport and to boost national pride. For example, for the 100th "Tour de France" in 2013, the organisers (the Amaury Sport Organisation) awarded three wildcards to French teams: Cofidis, Sojasun and Team Europcar, all of which were UCI Professional Continental teams at the time and therefore not automatically invited, unlike the UCI ProTeams which made up the vast majority of the entry list.
Teams can apply for a wildcard.

In January 2015, Team MTN-Qhubeka from South Africa accepted an invitation to participate in the 2015 edition of "Tour de France". MTN-Qhubeka was the first African team to receive a wildcard entry into the event that was held from 4 to 26 July 2015.

Rugby

European club rugby competitions 

Rugby union's analogue to the Euroleague is the European Rugby Champions Cup, which replaced the previous top-level club competition, the Heineken Cup, starting with the 2014–15 season. The Champions Cup maintains a system originally created for the Heineken Cup in which some "wildcard" teams advance to the competition's knockout stages. Also starting in 2014–15, the organiser of the Champions Cup, European Professional Club Rugby, introduced this type of "wildcard" to the second-level European Rugby Challenge Cup.

During the last five seasons of the Heineken Cup (2009–10 to 2013–14), another "wildcard" system allowed teams to parachute into the original European Challenge Cup, which has now been replaced by the current Challenge Cup. This was scrapped with the creation of the current Challenge Cup.

Both the Champions Cup and current Challenge Cup involve 20 clubs (compared to 24 in the Heineken Cup and 20 in the original Challenge Cup), divided into pools of four clubs with each club playing a double round-robin within its pool. In both competitions, eight clubs advance to the knockout stages. The top club in each pool advances; the three "wildcard" places are filled by the second-place clubs with the best overall records. For the Champions Cup, the number of wildcards increased by one from the Heineken Cup era; both versions of the Challenge Cup had three wildcards, but the original version filled them in an entirely different manner.

In the final years of the Heineken Cup, starting in 2009–10 and ending with the 2014 reorganisation of European club rugby, the three second-place teams with the next-best records after those that advanced to the Heineken Cup knockout stage parachuted into the Challenge Cup.

The tiebreaking procedure used to determine overall seeding, which was devised in the Heineken Cup era and carried over intact into the current era, is almost as elaborate as that of the NFL, with a total of seven steps (a coin flip is the last).

Prior to 2009–10, the original Challenge Cup also had "wildcard" teams entering its knockout stages. The top club in each pool advanced to the knockout stage, along with the three second-place teams with the best records, using the same tiebreaking procedure as the Heineken Cup. Starting in 2009–10, only the winner of each pool entered the knockout stage, to be joined by the teams parachuting in from the Heineken Cup. As noted above, with the creation of the new Challenge Cup, that competition abandoned this system in favour of the system used in the Champions Cup.

Super Rugby 

The Super Rugby competition, involving regional franchises from Australia, New Zealand, and South Africa, adopted a new playoff system with "wildcards" when it expanded to 15 teams in 2011.

In its previous incarnations as Super 12 and Super 14 (each number reflecting the number of teams in the competition), it used a Shaughnessy playoff system in which the top four teams advanced to a knockout stage. The expansion to 15 teams led to major changes in the competition format.

Through the 2015 season, the competition was divided into three conferences of five teams each, with every conference consisting solely of teams from one of the participating countries. At the end of the regular season, the winners of each conference received playoff berths. These teams were joined by three "wildcards", specifically the three non-winners with the most competition points without regard to conference. (Tiebreakers were employed as necessary.)

With the expansion of Super Rugby to 18 teams in 2016, featuring a permanent sixth franchise for South Africa and new teams based in Argentina and Japan, the competition format was changed again.

The competition is now divided into the Australasian Group, including all Australian and New Zealand teams, and the African Group, consisting of the South African teams plus the Argentine and Japanese franchises. In turn, the Australasian Group is divided into Australia and New Zealand Conferences, and the African Group is split into Africa 1 and Africa 2 Conferences. As in the 2011–15 system, the conference winners will receive playoff berths. The number of wildcards will increase to four, with the three top non-winners from the Australasian Group and the top non-winner from the African Group, again based on competition points, earning those spots.

Rugby World Cup 

In the current format of the Rugby World Cup, a team that finishes 3rd in their group automatically gains a berth in the next Rugby World Cup (although they do not advance to the next round).

Additionally, the Rugby World Cup qualifying format uses a repechage, in which teams from other regions that did not gain the automatic spot play each other for the final spots in the World Cup.

References

Bibliography
 
 

Sports terminology
Motorcycle racing
Terminology used in multiple sports